DWCT (1557 AM) was a radio station owned by Capitol Broadcasting Center and operated by Vizcaya Media Productions. Its studio and transmitter were located at Zone 5, Sol's Subd., Brgy. Bitano, Legazpi, Albay.

The station was launched in March 2016 as Radyo Uno under the management of Vizcaya Media Productions. On December 2, 2019, its transmitter was damaged by Typhoon Tisoy, leaving the station off the air for good.

References

External links
Radyo Uno FB Page

Radio stations in Legazpi, Albay
Radio stations established in 2017